Paddy Coupar (born 26 June 1986) is a former Scottish professional rugby league footballer who played for the Edinburgh Eagles in the Rugby League Conference Scotland Division. He is a current Scotland international.

Background
Coupar was born in Blairgowrie, Scotland.

Career
For the 2008 Rugby League World Cup Couper, playing for the Edinburgh Eagles, was the only Scottish player not selected under the grandparent rule.

International
Coupar was capped 9 times for Scotland

References

External links
(archived by web.archive.org) Workington profile
(archived by web.archive.org) lasttackle.com profile

1986 births
Living people
People from Blairgowrie and Rattray
Edinburgh Eagles players
Rugby league players from Perth and Kinross
Rugby league second-rows
Rugby union players from Perth and Kinross
Scottish rugby league players
Scottish rugby union players
Scotland national rugby league team players
Workington Town players